Saint-Martin-la-Pallu is a commune in the department of Vienne, western France. The municipality was established on 1 January 2017 by merger of the former communes of Vendeuvre-du-Poitou (the seat), Blaslay, Charrais and Cheneché. On 1 January 2019, the former commune Varennes was merged into Saint-Martin-la-Pallu.

Population
The population data given in the table below refer to the commune in its geography as of January 2020.

See also 
Communes of the Vienne department

References 

Saintmartinlapallu